Jung District, meaning "Central District," is the name of a gu (district) in several South Korean cities:

Jung District, Busan
Jung District, Daegu
Jung District, Daejeon
Jung District, Incheon
Jung District, Seoul
Jung District, Ulsan

See also
Chung-guyok, Pyongyang, North Korea
Central District (disambiguation)